Peter Yetten is a retired American football coach.  He served as the head football coach at Bentley University from 1979 to 2008, compiling a career record of 151–60–1 as a varsity coach and 225–81–2 overall.

Yetten played three seasons for the ice hockey program at Boston University, helping the team to their first national championship in 1971. At Bentley, he guided the program from a club team to varsity status.

Head coaching record

College

References

Year of birth missing (living people)
Living people
Bentley Falcons football coaches
Boston University Terriers football players
NCAA men's ice hockey national champions